The league included all top-performing clubs from their respective regional leagues of the East, West, and Central regions. The league was titled The Categorization League (Arabic: الدوري التصنيفي), because it categorized which clubs play in the Premier league and which clubs play in the Saudi First Division, making an end to Saudi Regional Leagues.

Sixteen teams took part on a home and away basis. The top four from each group qualified for the next official Premier league, whereas the bottom four of each group were removed from the league until the inclusion of the Saudi First Division. The top clubs from each group met on a final match to decide who's champion.

The championship was won by Al-Nassr.

Stadiums and locations
The 1974–75 Saudi Categorization League was contested by the top 16 teams in Saudi football at the time. Al-Ahli, Al-Ansar, Al-Ittihad, Al-Kefah, Al-Rabe'e, Al-Wehda, Ohod, and Okaz played in the top tier of the Western League at the time. Al-Hilal, Al-Nassr, Al-Shabab, and Al-Yamamah played in the top tier of the Central League at the time. And Al-Ettifaq, Al-Khaleej, Al-Nahda, and Al-Qadisiyah played in the top tier of the Eastern League at the time.

;Group A

Group B

League tables

Group A
Table

Group B
Table

Final match

References

External links 

Saudi Arabia Football Federation
Saudi League Statistics

Saudi
1975–76 in Saudi Arabian football